The Old Code is a 1928 American silent historical drama film directed by Ben F. Wilson and starring Walter McGrail, Lillian Rich and Cliff Lyons. It is based on a story by James Oliver Curwood and a Native American girl in love with a French fur trapper.

Cast
 Walter McGrail as Pierre Belleu 
 Lillian Rich as Marie d'Arcy  
 Cliff Lyons as Jacques de Long  
 Melbourne MacDowell as Steve MacGregor  
 J.P. McGowan as Raoul de Valle  
 Neva Gerber as Lola 
 Ervin Renard as Henri Langlis  
 Mary Gordon as Mary MacGregor
 Rhody Hathaway as Father Le Fane

References

Bibliography
 Langman, Larry.  A Guide to Silent Westerns. Greenwood Publishing Group, 1992.

External links

1928 films
Films directed by Ben F. Wilson
American silent feature films
1920s English-language films
1920s historical drama films
American historical drama films
American black-and-white films
1928 drama films
Films based on works by James Oliver Curwood
1920s American films
Silent American drama films